The Second Special Stakes was a Thoroughbred horse race run between 1886 and 1907 at Gravesend Race Track in Gravesend, on Coney Island, New York. The race was run on dirt at a distance of one and one half miles in its last nine runnings and was open to horses of either sex age three and older since inception.

Historical notes
The Second Special Stakes had only two starters in 1892 through 1895, 1897, and again in 1906. Some of this lack of competition may well be as a result of the purse distribution during that era when a third-place finisher collected only a very tiny portion. This situation often limited the number of entrants if there were one or two dominant entries as owners would switch their horse to run on another day when there was a race where they might have a reasonable chance of winning. In these six Second Special Stakes races with just two horses competing, all were won by a national Champion.

Demise of the Second Special Stakes
After years of uncertainty, on June 11, 1908 the Republican controlled New York Legislature under Governor Charles Evans Hughes passed the Hart–Agnew anti-betting legislation with penalties allowing for fines and up to a year in prison. The owners of Sheepshead Bay Race Track, and other racing facilities in New York State, struggled to stay in business without income from betting. Racetrack operators had no choice but cancel some races and drastically reduce the purse money being paid out which resulted in the Second Special Stakes being placed on hiatus. These small purses made racing horses highly unprofitable and impossible for even the most successful owners to continue in business. Further restrictive legislation was passed by the New York Legislature in 1910 which deepened the financial crisis for track operators and after a 1911 amendment to the law that would have limited the liability of owners and directors was defeated, every racetrack in New York State shut down. Owners, whose horses of racing age had nowhere to go, began sending them, their trainers and their jockeys to race in England and France. Many horses ended their racing careers there, and a number remained to become an important part of the European horse breeding industry. Thoroughbred Times reported that  more than 1,500 American horses were sent overseas between 1908 and 1913 and of them at least 24 were either past, present, or future Champions. When a February 21, 1913 ruling by the New York Supreme Court, Appellate Division Court saw horse racing return in 1913 it was too late for the Sheepshead Bay horse racing facility and it never reopened.

Records
Speed record:
 1 1/8 miles : 1:54.75 – Clifford  (1894)
 1 1/2 miles : 2:31.80 – Ballot (1907)

Most wins:
 2 – Clifford (1894, 1895)
 2 – Imp (1899, 1900)
 2 – Blues (1901, 1902)

Most wins by a jockey:
 4 – Willie Simms (1892, 1894, 1895, 1897)

Most wins by a trainer:
 3 – Thomas Welsh (1901, 1902, 1906)

Most wins by an owner:
 3 – Dwyer Brothers Stable / Michael F. Dwyer (1887, 1888, 1897)

Winners

References

Open mile category horse races
Open middle distance horse races
Discontinued horse races in New York City
Gravesend Race Track
Recurring sporting events established in 1886
Recurring sporting events disestablished in 1907
1886 establishments in New York (state)
1907 disestablishments in New York (state)